The Pingtung Line is a line of the Taiwan Railway Administration West Coast line in Taiwan. 

The section between Nanzhou and Linbian railway stations will be upgraded from a single-track railway to a double-track railway in December 2019 while the section between Chaozhou and Nanzhou, and the section between Linbian and Fangliao is expected to remain in single-track.

Taiwanese government stated in 2007 that it reserved the possibility to upgrade the entire section to dual-track railway when the number of travelers through Pingtung Line reaches a certain level

History
The line was completed in 1941. The section between Kaohsiung and Pingtung was electrified on July 10, 1996. The section between Pingtung and Chaozhou was electrified on August 23, 2015, when the elevated tracks between the two stations opened.

Chaozhou–Fangliao upgrades 
Immediately following the completion of the elevated tracks between Pingtung and Chaozhou, the TRA began planning for the electrification of the last section of the line between Chaozhou and Fangliao. The plan was approved by the Ministry of the Interior on June 3, 2013, and construction began on November 16, 2014.

Aside from electrifying the tracks, the following upgrades were carried out simultaneously:
 Extending and raising platforms at all stations to cater to low-floor trains
 Adding a second track between Nanzhou and Linbian
 Adding a second platform at Zhen'an and Jiadong

The infrastructure was completed in October 2019, and beginning on November 8, test runs using electric trains were carried out on the line. The electrified tracks officially entered service on December 23, 2019.

Stations

See also
 West Coast line (Taiwan)

References

1941 establishments in Taiwan
Railway lines opened in 1941
TRA routes
Southern Taiwan